Robert Andrews (1748–February 4, 1804) was a Colonial/American clergyman who became a military chaplain during the American Revolutionary War, then professor at the College of William and Mary as well as author and politician who represented James City County in the Virginia Ratification Convention, then represented Williamsburg in the Virginia House of Delegates (1790-1799).

Early and family life
Born in the near Elkton, Maryland and that colony's border with Pennsylvania, to the former Letitia Cooke and her husband Moses Andrews. His great-grandfather John Andrews emigrated to Province of Maryland from the County of Rutland, England in 1654. The family included four brothers, Moses Andrews, Rev. John Andrews, James Andrews and Polydore Andrews.

Education and ordination
Andrews studied at the  College of Philadelphia beginning in 1766, under provost William Smith and professor Francis Allison. He graduated with an A.B. degree in 1768, then studied theology like his older brother John. In 1769 he traveled to Gloucester County, Virginia to tutor the children of planter and future Virginia governor John Page. In 1772 Andrews sailed to London, where he was ordained a priest.

Career

Professor and revolutionary patriot
In late 1774, Andrews became one of the thirteen men (only a few clergymen), to sign a document drafted by eighty-nine former members of the House of Burgesses, which recommended a general congress as well as a non-importation association. The following year he joined the York County Committee of Safety.

As conflict with England worsened, the College of William and Mary in Williamsburg was thrown into turmoil. Professor of Moral Philosophy Samuel Henley fled to England. College President John Camm and two other professors were forced to resign. Only Rev. James Madison, who taught Natural Philosophy and mathematics (and was cousin of the future U.S. President of the same name) and James Bracken (master of the grammar school) remained by 1777.

In 1777, Rev. Andrews enlisted as a chaplain to the 2nd regiment of the Virginia militia under Col. George Gibson, and served until 1780.

In December 1777 Andrews accepted an appointment as Professor of Moral Philosophy at the College of William & Mary, but the college was often closed during the conflict. In October 1778, Andrews chaired the meeting to elect the Grand Master of the Grand Lodge of Virginia and became the deputy to John Blair Jr., who was a prominent local lawyer and who would become an Associate Justice of the U.S. Supreme Court in his final years. When the college was reorganized in 1779 under the guidance of Thomas Jefferson and George Wythe (who became the country's first law professor), the grammar school was closed, the professorship of oriental languages was abolished and Rev. Madison resumed teaching Moral Philosophy. However, Andrews retained his position, with the Law of Nature and Nations and the Fine Arts added to his teaching portfolio. Andrews became the first college professor in the new nation to have fine arts included in his professorship. Andrews published an almanac in at least 1781, 1783, 1794 and 1795. In 1784 he accepted the important mathematical professorship (the college certifying all surveyors in the new Commonwealth), and retained his position as professor until his death.

Williamsburg voters elected Andrews to their Committee of Safety in 1779, and soon afterward, he became one of the town's alderman. The college closed in late 1780 due to troop movements and the Battle of Green Spring before the Siege of Yorktown.

Politician
In 1781, Andrews became the personal secretary for governor Thomas Nelson.

His next elective office was as one of the delegates for James City County to the Virginia Ratifying Convention of 1788, which approved the United States Constitution. Beginning in 1790, Williamsburg voters elected and re-elected Andrews as their (part-time) representative in the Virginia House of Delegates (1790–1798), although the new state's capital had moved to Richmond. He succeeded Edmund Randolph and was re-elected until 1799. In 1798, Andrews voted against the Virginia Resolution opposing the federal Alien and Sedition Acts. Williamsburg voters elected him to succeed Edmund Randolph in the House of Delegates and re-elected him numerous times.

Reverend James Madison and Andrews both served on the federal commission that established the final border between Virginia and Pennsylvania.

Personal life
He married, first, Elizabeth Ballard (1745-1793), whose father had been clerk of Princess Anne County, Maryland. Although neither of their sons married, nor did daughter Elizabeth, their firstborn daughter Anne married William Randolph of Wilton and their third daughter Catherine married Joseph Biddle Wilkinson (son of General Wilkinson, and who moved to Louisiana). After her death, Andrews remarried, to Mary Blair (1758-1820), daughter of Justice John Blair, but they had no children.

Death and legacy
Andrews died in Williamsburg on February 4, 1804. The Swem Library of the College of William and Mary holds his papers, including a receipt for the sale of one slave.

References

1748 births
1804 deaths
Delegates to the Virginia Ratifying Convention
18th-century American politicians
Members of the Virginia House of Delegates
College of William & Mary faculty
University of Pennsylvania alumni
American military chaplains
American Revolution chaplains
Politicians from Williamsburg, Virginia
People of colonial Pennsylvania